A markup rule is the pricing practice of a producer with market power, where a firm charges a fixed mark-up over its marginal cost.

Derivation of the markup rule

Mathematically, the markup rule can be derived for a firm with price-setting power by maximizing the following expression for profit:

where 
Q = quantity sold,
P(Q) = inverse demand function, and thereby the price at which Q can be sold given the existing demand
C(Q) = total cost of producing Q.
 = economic profit

 where 

P'(Q) = the derivative of the inverse demand function.
C'(Q) = marginal cost–the derivative of total cost with respect to output.

This yields:

or "marginal revenue" = "marginal cost".

By definition  is the reciprocal of the price elasticity of demand (or ). Hence

Letting  be the reciprocal of the price elasticity of demand,

Thus a firm with market power chooses the output quantity at which the corresponding price satisfies this rule. Since for a price-setting firm  this means that a firm with market power will charge a price above marginal cost and thus earn a monopoly rent. On the other hand, a competitive firm by definition faces a perfectly elastic demand; hence it has  which means that it sets the quantity such that marginal cost equals the price.

The rule also implies that, absent menu costs, a firm with market power will never choose a point on the inelastic portion of its demand curve (where  and ). Intuitively, this is because starting from such a point, a reduction in quantity and the associated increase in price along the demand curve would yield both an increase in revenues (because demand is inelastic at the starting point) and a decrease in costs (because output has decreased); thus the original point was not profit-maximizing.

References

Pricing